Tomoya Yokoyama (横山 朋哉, Yokoyama Tomoya) is a Japanese kickboxer, currently competing in the super featherweight division of K-1.

As of November 2021, he was the #6 ranked Bantamweight in the world by Combat Press.

Kickboxing career

J-NETWORK
Yokoyama made his professional debut against Tadakatsu at J-FIGHT & J-GIRLS 2016 1st on March 27, 2016. He won the fight by unanimous decision. 

Yokoyama was scheduled to face Yoshifumi Fujita at J-KICK 2016～Honor the fighting spirits～3rd on October 10, 2016. He won the fight by unanimous decision.

Yokoyama was scheduled to face SHUN JANJIRA at J-FIGHT & J-GIRLS 2017～J-NETWORK 20th Anniversary～2nd on April 23, 2017. He suffered his first professional loss, as he dropped a unanimous decision to Shun.

K-1
Yokoyama was scheduled to make his K-1 debut against Kazuma Kubo at K-1 WORLD GP 2018 JAPAN Featherweight Tournament on June 17, 2018. He won the fight by a third-round knockout.

Yokoyama was scheduled to face Takuma Kawaguchi at KHAOS.6 on September 1, 2018. The fight was ruled a unanimous decision draw after the first three rounds were contested, with all three judges scoring it an even 29-29. Yokoyama was awarded the unanimous decision, after an extra round was fought.

Yokoyama was scheduled to face Yuya at K-1 WORLD GP 2018 JAPAN Super Lightweight Tournament on November 3, 2018. He won the fight by a first-round knockout.

Yokoyama was scheduled to face Yuto Saito at Krush.99 on March 30, 2019. He won the fight by a first-round knockout.

Yokoyama was scheduled to face the future K-1 Lightweight champion Taio Asahisa at Krush 104 on August 31, 2019. Asahisa won the fight by unanimous decision.

Yokoyama was scheduled to face Chihiro Nakajima at Krush 111 on February 24, 2020. He won the fight by unanimous decision. 

Yokoyama was scheduled to face the former Krush Super Featherweight champion Yuma Saikyo at Krush.117 on September 26, 2020. He won the fight by unanimous decision. 

Yokoyama was then scheduled to fight TETSU at K-1: K’Festa 4 on January 24, 2021. The event was later rescheduled for March 31, 2021. Eleven days before the event, TETSU withdrew from the bout due to a torn meniscus, and was replaced by Yusuke. Yokoyama won the fight by knockout, stopping his opponent after just 29 seconds.

Krush Super Featherweight tournament
Yokoyama participated in the 2021 Krush Super Featherweight tournament. He was scheduled to face Ryoga Matsumoto in the tournament quarterfinals, held at Krush 130 on October 31, 2021. Yokoyama won the fight by a second-round technical knockout, as he floored Matsumoto with a left hook at the 2:40 minute mark.

Yokoyama faced Naoki Yamamoto in the tournament semifinals, which were held on January 28, 2022. After a poor first round, during which he was knocked down, Yokoyama won the fight by a second-round technical knockdown. He managed to knock Yamamoto down twice by the midway point of the second round, forcing the referee to wave the fight off. He advanced to the tournament finals, which were held on the same day, where he faced Chihiro Nakajima. After an even first two rounds, Nakajima managed to knock Yokoyama down in the third round. This knockdown proved crucial, as Nakajima won the fight by unanimous decision.

K-1 Super Featherweight Grand Prix
Yokoyama faced Katsuki Ishida at Krush.138 on June 17, 2022. He won the fight by a dominant unanimous decision, with two judges scoring the bout 30–24 in his favor, while the third judge scored it 30–25 for him. Yokoyama knocked Ishida down twice in the first round, first time with repeated left hooks and the second time with a flying knee, and once in the third round, with a left straight.

After successfully rebounding from his loss to Nakajima, Yokoyama took part in the 2022 K-1 Super Featherweight World Grand Prix, held to crown a new champion after the previous titleholder Takeru Segawa vacated the belt. Yokoyama was booked to face the ISKA World K-1 lightweight champion Bailey Sugden in the tournament quarterfinals at K-1 World GP 2022 Yokohamatsuri on September 11, 2022. Sugden withdrew from the fight on August 3, due to an injury, and was replaced by Stavros Exakoustidis. He won the fight by a third-round knockout. Yokoyama failed to advance further in the tournament however, as he lost by a first-round technical knockout to Hirotaka Asahisa, who knocked him down twice by the 0:37 minute mark of the opening round.

Later K-1 career
Yokoyama faced Petchsamui Shimura at Krush.146 on February 25, 2023. He won the fight by unanimous decision, with all three judges scoring the bout 28–26 in his favor. Although Yokoyama was able to knock his opponent down once apiece in both the first and second round, he was himself knocked down with low kicks in the third and final round of the contest.

Titles and accomplishments

Professional
2016 J-NETWORK Rookie of the Year Tournament Champion 

Amateur
 2015 J-NETWORK All Japan A-League -58kg Champion 
 2017 K-1 Koshien ‐60kg Runner-up

Kickboxing record

|-  style="text-align:center; background:#cfc;"
| 2023-02-25 || Win || align=left| Petchsamui Shimura ||  Krush.146  || Tokyo, Japan || Decision (unanimous)|| 3 || 3:00  

|-  style="text-align:center; background:#fbb;"
| 2022-09-11 || Loss || align=left| Hirotaka Asahisa ||  K-1 World GP 2022 Yokohamatsuri, Tournament Semifinals || Yokohama, Japan || TKO (Two knockdowns) || 1 || 0:37

|-  style="text-align:center; background:#cfc;"
| 2022-09-11 || Win || align=left| Stavros Exakoustidis ||  K-1 World GP 2022 Yokohamatsuri, Tournament Quarterfinals  || Yokohama, Japan || KO (High kick) || 3 || 1:41 
|-
|-  style="text-align:center; background:#cfc;"
| 2022-06-17 || Win || align=left| Katsuki Ishida ||  Krush.138  || Tokyo, Japan || Decision (unanimous)|| 3 ||3:00  
|-  style="text-align:center; background:#fbb"
| 2022-01-28 || Loss || align=left| Chihiro Nakajima|| Krush 133, -60kg Championship Tournament Final || Tokyo, Japan || Decision (unanimous) || 3 ||3:00
|-
! style=background:white colspan=9 |
|-  style="text-align:center; background:#cfc"
| 2022-01-28 || Win || align=left| Naoki Yamamoto || Krush 133, -60kg Championship Tournament Semi Finals || Tokyo, Japan || TKO (2 knockdowns rule) || 2 ||1:54
|-  style="text-align:center; background:#cfc;"
| 2021-10-31 ||Win || align=left| Ryoga Matsumoto|| Krush 130, -60kg Championship Tournament Quarter Finals || Tokyo, Japan || KO (punches) || 2||2:40
|-  style="text-align:center; background:#cfc;"
| 2021-03-28|| Win ||align=left| Yusuke || K-1 World GP 2021: K’Festa 4 Day.2 || Tokyo, Japan || KO (left cross) || 1 || 0:29
|-  style="text-align:center; background:#cfc;"
| 2020-09-26|| Win||align=left| Yuma Saikyo || Krush.117 || Tokyo, Japan || Decision (unanimous)|| 3 ||3:00
|-  style="text-align:center; background:#cfc;"
| 2020-02-24|| Win ||align=left| Chihiro Nakajima || Krush 111|| Tokyo, Japan || Decision (unanimous) ||3 || 3:00
|-  style="text-align:center; background:#FFBBBB;"
| 2019-08-31|| Loss ||align=left| Taio Asahisa || Krush 104 || Tokyo, Japan || Decision (unanimous) || 3 || 3:00
|-  style="text-align:center; background:#CCFFCC;"
| 2019-03-30|| Win ||align=left| Yuto Saito || Krush.99 || Tokyo, Japan || TKO (Left cross) || 1 || 2:00
|-  style="text-align:center; background:#CCFFCC;"
| 2018-11-03|| Win ||align=left| Yuya || K-1 WORLD GP 2018 JAPAN Super Lightweight Tournament || Tokyo, Japan || TKO (left cross) || 1 || 0:35
|-  style="text-align:center; background:#CCFFCC;"
| 2018-09-01|| Win ||align=left| Takuma Kawaguchi || KHAOS.6 || Tokyo, Japan || Ext.R Decision (unanimous) || 4 || 3:00
|-  style="text-align:center; background:#CCFFCC;"
| 2018-06-17|| Win ||align=left| Kazuma Kubo || K-1 WORLD GP 2018 JAPAN Featherweight Tournament || Tokyo, Japan || TKO (punches) || 2 || 2:05
|-  style="text-align:center; background:#FFBBBB;"
| 2017-04-23|| Loss||align=left| SHUN JANJIRA || J-FIGHT & J-GIRLS 2017～J-NETWORK 20th Anniversary～2nd || Tokyo, Japan || Decision (unanimous) || 3 || 3:00
|-  style="text-align:center; background:#CCFFCC;"
| 2016-10-10|| Win||align=left| Yoshifumi Fujita || J-KICK 2016～Honor the fighting spirits～3rd || Tokyo, Japan || Decision (unanimous) || 3 || 3:00
|-  style="text-align:center; background:#CCFFCC;"
| 2016-03-27|| Win||align=left| Tadakatsu || J-FIGHT & J-GIRLS 2016 1st || Tokyo, Japan || Decision (unanimous) || 3 || 3:00
|-
| colspan=9 | Legend:    

|-  style="background:#FFBBBB;"
| 2017-11-23|| Loss||align=left| Shoki Kaneda || K-1 World GP 2017 Heavyweight Championship Tournament, Koshien Tournament Final|| Saitama, Japan || Decision (Unanimous) || 3 || 2:00 
|-
! style=background:white colspan=9 |
|-  style="background:#CCFFCC;"
| 2017-07-29|| Win||align=left| Akihiro Aikawa || K-1 Koshien 2017 Tournament, Semi Final|| Tokyo, Japan || Decision (Unanimous) || 1 || 2:00
|-  style="background:#CCFFCC;"
| 2017-07-29|| Win||align=left| Shota Tezuka || K-1 Koshien 2017 Tournament, Quarter Final|| Tokyo, Japan || KO || 1 ||
|-  style="background:#CCFFCC;"
| 2017-07-29|| Win||align=left| Kazuma Okamoto || K-1 Koshien 2017 Tournament, First Round|| Tokyo, Japan || KO || 1 ||
|-  style="background:#FFBBBB;"
| 2016-07-30|| Loss||align=left| Yuta Hayashi || K-1 Koshien 2016 Tournament, Quarter Final|| Tokyo, Japan || Ext.R Decision (Unanimous) || 2 || 2:00
|-  style="background:#CCFFCC;"
| 2016-07-30|| Win||align=left| Retsu Akabane || K-1 Koshien 2016 Tournament, Second Round|| Tokyo, Japan || Decision (Unanimous) || 1 || 2:00
|-  style="background:#CCFFCC;"
| 2016-07-30|| Win||align=left| Riamu Sera|| K-1 Koshien 2016 Tournament, First Round|| Tokyo, Japan || Decision (Unanimous) || 1 || 2:00
|-  style="background:#CCFFCC;"
| 2015-11-22|| Win||align=left| Yuji Nakada || J-NETWORK All Japan Championship, A-League Tournament Final|| Tokyo, Japan || Decision (Majority)||  || 
|-
! style=background:white colspan=9 |
|-  style="background:#CCFFCC;"
| 2015-11-22|| Win||align=left| Kosuke Murodate || J-NETWORK All Japan Championship, A-League Tournament Semi Final || Tokyo, Japan || Decision (Unanimous)||  ||
|-  style="background:#CCFFCC;"
| 2015-11-22|| Win||align=left| Shun Sato || J-NETWORK All Japan Championship, A-League Tournament Quarter Final || Tokyo, Japan || Ext.R Decision (Split)||  ||
|-  style="background:#CCFFCC;"
| 2015-11-22|| Win||align=left| Takumi Kumagaya || J-NETWORK All Japan Championship, A-League Tournament First Round || Tokyo, Japan || Decision (Unanimous)||  ||
|-  style="background:#CCFFCC;"
| 2015-09-06|| Win||align=left| Hiroki Kawate || J-FIGHT 44 - J-NETWORK Amateur Championship Tournament, Final|| Tokyo, Japan || Decision (Unanimous) || 1 || 3:00
|-
! style=background:white colspan=9 |
|-  style="background:#FFBBBB;"
| 2015-08-15|| Loss ||align=left| Haruma Saikyo || K-1 Koshien 2015 Tournament, Quarter Final|| Tokyo, Japan || Ext.R Decision || 2 || 2:00
|-  style="background:#CCFFCC;"
| 2015-08-15|| Win||align=left| Kenta Izumi || K-1 Koshien 2015 Tournament, First Round|| Tokyo, Japan || KO || 1 ||
|-  style="background:#CCFFCC;"
| 2015-05-24|| Win||align=left| Yuji Nakada ||J-NETWORK 4th Amateur Championship Tournament, Semi Final|| Tokyo, Japan || Decision (Unanimous) || 1 || 3:00
|-  style="background:#fbb;"
| 2014-11-23|| Loss||align=left| Kyohei Isoda || J-NETWORK All Japan Championship, A-League Tournament First Round || Tokyo, Japan || Ext.R Decision (Split)||  || 
|-
| colspan=9 | Legend:

See also
List of male kickboxers

References

Living people
2000 births
Japanese male kickboxers
Flyweight kickboxers
People from Ōta, Gunma
Sportspeople from Gunma Prefecture